Neurogalesus is a genus of parasitoid wasps.

Species
 Neurogalesus carinatus
 Neurogalesus militis

References

Parasitica
Parasitic wasps
Insects described in 1907
Diapriidae